Kaniów may refer to:
Polish name for Kaniv in Ukraine
Kaniów, Świętokrzyskie Voivodeship (south-central Poland)
Kaniów, Silesian Voivodeship (south Poland)
Kaniów, Lubusz Voivodeship (west Poland)
Kaniów, Opole Voivodeship (south-west Poland)
Battle of Kaniów, during World War I